Diarists who wrote diaries concerning the Holocaust (1941-1945).

 Mary Berg
 Hélène Berr - a French diarist
 Willy Cohn
 Adam Czerniaków
 Arnold Daghani
 Petr Ginz
 Zalman Gradowski
 Etty Hillesum - Dutch Jewish diarist and Holocaust victim; kept a diary in Amsterdam and in the Westerbork transit camp 
(Etty Hillesum and the Flow of Presence: A Voegelinian Analysis)
 David Kahane
 Zelig Kalmanovich
 Victor Klemperer
 Janusz Korczak
 Herman Kruk
 Leib Langfus
 Rywka Lipszyc
 Calel Perechodnik
 Sam Pivnik - Polish Jewish Holocaust survivor, author and memoirist
 Yitskhok Rudashevski
 Tanya Savicheva
 Leokadia Schmidt
 Mihail Sebastian
 Shalom Yoran

Teenaged Holocaust diarists 
 Janina Altman (aka Janina Hescheles, who wrote My Lvov)
 Hana Brady (aka Hana "Hanička" Bradyová) – subject of the children's book Hana's Suitcase
 Miriam Chaszczewacki – a Polish diarist killed in the Radomsko ghetto
 Helga Deen – wrote a diary in Herzogenbusch concentration camp (Camp Vught)
 Anne Frank – author of The Diary of a Young Girl
 Eva Heyman – wrote a diary in Oradea / Nagyvarad in Transylvania including in the Ghetto. 
 Věra Kohnová – Czech Jewish diarist
 David Koker – wrote a diary in Herzogenbusch concentration camp (Camp Vught)
 Rutka Laskier – Polish Jewish diarist and Holocaust victim
 Dawid Rabinowicz – Polish Jewish diarist and Holocaust victim
 Renia Spiegel – a Jewish diarist in Poland
 Julius Feldman – 19-year-old Jewish diarist in the Krakow Ghetto

See also
 List of posthumous publications of Holocaust victims

20th-century diarists
 Diarists
Holocaust diaries
Diarists
Lists of writers